Roman Andrzej Tokarczyk (born March 1942) is a legal scholar and philosopher, full professor, lecturing at the Faculty of Law and Administration, Maria Curie-Sklodowska University (UMCS) in Lublin, Poland, and at the Faculty of Management and Administration of the Zamość University of Management and Administration. He specializes in ethics, history of political law doctrines, comparative legal studies, philosophy of law and in American law. He has authored popular books in these fields and translated works of Hobbes and Fuller.

Career 
Tokarczyk was born Gródki, Poland. In 1961, Tokarczyk finished Pedagogical High School in Biłgoraj; in 1966 he graduated with MA degrees in law and philosophy from UMCS. He served as councilor of the Municipal People's Council in Lublin in 1969–1973. Awarded a PhD degree in 1970, he received a postdoctoral degree (Habilitation) in 1976. He was appointed professor extraordinary in 1990 and full professor in 1994.

Since 1979, he has been Head of the Department of Theory of Organization and Management, Faculty of Law and Administration. From 1996 to 2000 he was Dean of the Faculty of Law and Economics, of the Studii Generalis Sandomiriensis College of Humanities and Natural Sciences in Sandomierz. From 1993 to 1997 he served as member of the Trybunału Stanu. He was professor at the University of Rzeszów and Radom Academy of Economics in Radom.

He spent research stays as a Fulbright fellow inter alia at the International Research and Exchange Board in New York City, at the University of Notre Dame, Harvard, University of California, Berkeley, UCLA and under the NATO Foundation in Paris, Rome, Vienna, and Copenhagen.
 
He has supervised 2,311 bachelor's and master's degree theses and reviewed 3,212 of them. He has supervised nine doctoral dissertations (PhDs awarded) and seven pending doctoral procedures, and also reviewed 18 doctoral dissertations and eleven Habilitationsschrifts (postdoctoral dissertations). He has prepared opinions for several procedures of conferment of professorial titles and has reviewed the motion for the conferral procedure of the honorary doctoral degree.

He is a member of many scholarly organizations, including Polska Akademia Medycyny (the Polish Medical Academy), Polish Academy of Sciences (PAN) Committees, the New York Academy of Sciences, and the Executive Committee of the International Communal Studies Association.

Tokarczyk introduced the term 'biojurisprudence' as a branch of the science of law which deals with the regulations of threats to human life from the moment of conception to death. He also introduced the following terms: 'biolaw' (legal regulations of problems concerning the subject of biojurisprudence), 'biojusgenesis' (religious, moral and legal problems concerning the normative protection of the conceived human being and human fetus), 'biojustherapy' (religious, moral and legal problems of the normative protection of human life  from birth to death), and 'biojusthanatology' (normative problems concerning human death – religious, moral and legal).

Awards 
Decorations include Bronze, Silver and Gold Crosses of Merit, the Bronze Medal of merit for Defense of the Country, an Honorary Badge for Merit for the Lublin Region, and Badge for Merit for the Zamość Province, along with many other medals, diplomas and awards.

Books 
 Współczesne doktryny polityczne (1971) Contemporary Political Doctrines
 25 Lat Wydziału Prawa i Administracji Uniwersytetu Marii Curie-Skłodowskiej (1975) 25 Years of the Faculty of Law and Administration of Maria Curie-Sklodowska University 
 Winstanley (1975)
 Prawa wierne naturze. Krytyka doktryny Lona Luvois Fullera (1976) Laws True to Nature. A Critique of Lon Luvois Fuller's Doctrine
 Doktryna Prawa Natury Lona Luvois Fullera (1976) Lon Luvois Fullers Doctrine of  Natural Law
 Utopia Nowej Lewicy Amerykańskiej (1979) Utopia of the American New Left
 Współczesna amerykańska myśl polityczna (1981) Contemporary American Political Thought
 Szkice z Myśli Politycznej Marksizmu (1981) Sketches on the Political Thought of Marxism
 Tradycja i postęp w prawie (red.) (1983)   Tradition and Progress in Law (ed.)
 Prawa narodzin, życia i śmierci (1984)    The Law of Birth, Life and Death
 Hobbes. Zarys żywota i myśli (1987)   Hobbes. An Outline of Life and Thought
 Historia filozofii prawa (1988)    History of Philosophy of Law
 Klasycy praw natury (1988)         Natural Law Classics
 Komparatystyka prawnicza (1989) Comparative Law
 Gródki. Dzieje wsi roztoczańskiej (1992) Gródki. A Roztocze Village's History
 Filozofia prawa (1993) Philosophy of Law
 Rozważania o sprawiedliwości (1993)  Considerations about Justice
 Polska myśl utopijna (1995)    Polish Utopian Thought
 Prawo amerykańskie (1996)    American Law
 Biojurysprudencja. Nowy nurt jurysprudencji (1997) Biojurisprudence. A New Current in Jurisprudence
 Współczesne kultury prawne (2000).    Contemporary Legal Cultures
 Ze sztandarem prawa przez świat (2002)   With the   Banner of Law across the World (co-edited by Krzysztof Motyka)
 Turobin. Dzieje miejscowości (2002)  Turobin. A History of the Town
 Przykazania etyki prawniczej. Księga myśli, norm i rycin (2003)  Commandments of Legal Ethics. A Book of Thoughts, Norms and Sketches
 Etyka Prawnicza (2005) [Legal Ethics]
 Antologia Anegdoty Akademickiej (2006) The Anthology of Academic Anecdotes
 Biojurysprudencja. Podstawy prawa dla XXI wieku (2008) (in English below)
 Biojurisprudence. Foundations of Law for The Twenty-First Century (2008)
 Nowa Lewica (2010) (The New Left)
 Medycyna a Normy (2011) (Medicine and Norms)
 Liceum Pedagogiczne w Biłgoraju (2011) (Pedagogical High School in Biłgoraj)

Bibliography 
 Juha - Pekka Rentto, Bioiurisprudence? A Comment to Professor Tokarczyk, Recent Developments and State Practice, Helsinki, 1999.
 Jan Klabbers, Bioiurisprudence?, "Religion and Human Rights. An International Jurnal, Helsinki, no. 20, 1999.
 Wagner Wenceslas J., Comment On Prof. Tokarczyk’s Article „The Subject Matter of Bioiurisprudence and Biolaw”, Dialoque and Universalism 2000, vol. X, No. 7-8.
 Aleksander Mereżko, Biojurysprudencja - nowij napriom w suczastii naući prawa, "Juridićieskij Żurnał" 2008, nr 1.
 Jerzy Jaskiernia, Biojurysprudencja - nowe oblicze prawa. "Państwo i Prawo" 2008, z. 11.
 Jan Filip, Biojurisprudence - nový pohled na právo nebo jen nový směr právní vědy?, Časopis pro právní vědu a praxi, Roč. 17, č. 2(2009), s. 71-76
 Mateusz Godawa, Biojurisprudence as an Original Concept of Knowledge and Information on the Law,  Proceedings of the 8th International Conference on Human Rights. The Rights to Knowledge and Information in a Heterogenic Society. Edited by: Bronisław Sitek, Jakub J. Szczerbowski, Aleksander W. Bauknecht and Anna Kaczyńska, Cambridge Scholars Publishing 2009, s. 350 - 372
 Oktawian Nawrot, Jerzy Zajadło, Biojurysprudencja - dom zbudowany na piasku czy na skale?, Diametros 2009, nr 22 s. 172 - 177
 Jerzy Stelmach, Bartosz Brożek, Marta Soniewicka, Wojciech Załuski Paradoksy bioetyki prawniczej, Warszawa 2010
 Anetta Breczko, Podmiotowość prawna człowieka w warunkach postępu biotechnomedycznego, Białystok 2011, s. 39, 414.
 Słownik Bioetyki, Biopolityki i Ekofilozofii, Redakcja naukowa Mariusz Ciszek, Polskie Towarzystwo Filozoficzne, Warszawa 2008 S. 32 - 33
 Biojurysprudencja. Podstawy prawa dla XXI wieku. Roman Tokarczyk. Wydawnictwo Uniwersytetu Marii Curie - Skłodowskiej, Lublin, 2008

External links 
 Roman Tokarczyk official website

Philosophers of law
Polish legal scholars
Living people
1942 births
Academic staff of Maria Curie-Skłodowska University